Donald Stuart McCalman (18 October 1935 – 14 September 2017) was a Scottish professional football player and manager.

Playing career
Born in Greenock, McCalman played as a centre half for Armadale Thistle, Hibernian, Bradford (Park Avenue) and Barrow. He served as captain of Bradford (Park Avenue), and equalled Jack Scott's record of successive appearances for the club (at 155), a record which was later broken by Kevin Hector (166).

Coaching career
He served as manager of Bradford (Park Avenue) between September and December 1968, before becoming assistant to Laurie Brown. He returned as manager between 1969 and February 1970.

Later life and death
He lived in the Horton Bank Top area of Bradford, and died on 14 September 2017 aged 81.

References

1935 births
2017 deaths
Scottish footballers
Armadale Thistle F.C. players
Hibernian F.C. players
Bradford (Park Avenue) A.F.C. players
Barrow A.F.C. players
English Football League players
Association football defenders
Scottish football managers
Bradford (Park Avenue) A.F.C. managers
Bradford (Park Avenue) A.F.C. non-playing staff